Crew Lake is an unincorporated community in Richland Parish, Louisiana, United States.

History
Crew Lake took the name of the river nearby.

References

Unincorporated communities in Richland Parish, Louisiana
Unincorporated communities in Louisiana